This is a list of radioactive nuclides (sometimes also called isotopes), ordered by half-life from shortest to longest, in seconds, minutes, hours, days, and years.  Current methods make it difficult to measure half-lives between approximately 10−19 and 10−10 seconds.

10−24 seconds (yoctoseconds)

23 yoctoseconds is the time needed to traverse a 7 femtometre distance at the speed of light, around the diameter of a large atomic nucleus.

10−21 seconds (zeptoseconds)

10−18 seconds (attoseconds)

10−15 seconds (femtoseconds)

10−12 seconds (picoseconds)

10−9 seconds (nanoseconds)

10−6 seconds (microseconds)

10−3 seconds (milliseconds)

100 seconds

103 seconds (kiloseconds)

106 seconds (megaseconds)

109 seconds (gigaseconds)

1012 seconds (teraseconds)

1015 seconds (petaseconds)

1018 seconds (exaseconds)

1021 seconds (zettaseconds)

1024 seconds (yottaseconds)

1027 seconds (ronnaseconds)

1030 seconds (quettaseconds)

The half-life of tellurium-128 is over 160 trillion times greater than the age of the universe (which is  seconds).

See also
List of elements by stability of isotopes
List of nuclides
Orders of magnitude (time)
Lists of isotopes, by element

Notes

External links
Radioactive isotope table "lists ALL radioactive nuclei with a half-life greater than 1000 years", incorporated in the list above.
The NUBASE2020 evaluation of nuclear physics properties F.G. Kondev et al. 2021 Chinese Phys. C 45 030001. The PDF of this article lists the half-lives of all known radioactives nuclides.

List
Radioactive
Radioactivity
Tables of nuclides